The Hochschule für Musik und Theater Hamburg is one of the larger universities of music in Germany.

It was founded 1950 as Staatliche Hochschule für Musik (Public college of music) on the base of the former private acting school of Annemarie Marks-Rocke and Eduard Marks.

Courses cover various musical genres, including church music, jazz, pop, composition, conducting, instrumental music as well as voice. The theatre academy offers courses in drama and opera and directing in these fields. A third academy offers scientific and educational degrees and qualifications (musicology, music education and therapy).

The university is located in the prestigious Budge-Palais in Hamburg Rotherbaum at the Außenalster, close to the city centre.

Directors 
Philipp Jarnach (1950–59)
Wilhelm Maler (1959–69)
Hajo Hinrichs (1969–78)
Hermann Rauhe (1978–2004)
Michael von Troschke (April to October 2004)
Elmar Lampson (since October 2004)

Faculty 
 Beatrix Borchard, musicology (from 2002)
 Margot Guilleaume, voice (1950–78)
 György Ligeti, composition (1973-1988)
 Henny Wolff, voice (1950–1964)
 Heinz Wunderlich, organ (1919–2012)

Former students 

Erdoğan Atalay
Ingrid Bachér
Lisa Batiashvili
Hermann Baumann
Dagmar Berghoff
Oliver Bendt

Margit Carstensen
Unsuk Chin
Xiaoyong Chen
Marko Ciciliani
Angela Denoke
Justus von Dohnányi
Christoph Eschenbach
Justus Frantz
Evelyn Hamann
Hannelore Hoger
Olga Jegunova
Peter Jordan
Toshiyuki Kamioka
Wiebke Lehmkuhl
Susanne Lothar
Marie-Luise Marjan
Günther Morbach
Talia Or
Corinna von Rad
Ivan Rebroff
Dorothea Röschmann
Catherine Rückwardt
Tanja Tetzlaff
Iris Vermillion

See also 
 Education in Hamburg
 Music schools in Germany

External links 

 Hochschule fur Musik und Theater Hamburg

 
Educational institutions established in 1950
Music schools in Germany
Universities and colleges in Hamburg
Buildings and structures in Eimsbüttel
Theatres in Hamburg
1950 establishments in West Germany